The 1954–55 National Hurling League was the 24th season of the National Hurling League.

Division 1

Tipperary came into the season as defending champions of the 1953–54 season.

On 1 May 1955, Tipperary won the title after a 3-5 to 1-5 win over Wexford in the final. It was their 6th league title and their second title in succession.

Group 1A table

Group 1B table

Knock-out stage
Semi-final

Final

References

National Hurling League seasons
Lea
Lea